Lakeview may refer to the following places in the U.S. state of North Carolina:
Lakeview, Alamance County, North Carolina
Lakeview, Davidson County, North Carolina
Lakeview, Moore County, North Carolina